The 2017–18 season was Al-Ahli's 42nd consecutive season in the top flight of Saudi football and 80th year in existence as a football club. They entered this season looking to rebound from a disappointing 2016–17 campaign, when they finished as runners-up in both the league and King Cup. Al-Ahli also participated in the King Cup, and both the 2017 and 2018 edition of the AFC Champions League. The season covered the period from 1 July 2017 to 30 June 2018.

Players

Squad information

AFC Champions League squad

Source: 2018 AFC Champions League squad

Transfers

In

Summer

Winter

Out

Summer

Winter

Loan in

Winter

Loan out

Summer

Winter

Pre-season and friendlies

Competitions

Overview

Goalscorers

Last Updated: 14 May 2018

Clean sheets

Last Updated: 17 April 2018

References

Al-Ahli Saudi FC seasons
Ahli